Han Song-hyok (born 11 December 1987) is a North Korean professional footballer who plays as a midfielder and represented the North Korea on two occasions.

References

External links 
 
Han Song-hyok at DPRKFootball

1987 births
Living people
North Korean footballers
North Korea international footballers
Association football midfielders
2015 AFC Asian Cup players